Bojan Kovačević (born 22 May 2004) is a Serbian professional footballer who plays as a defender for Čukarički.

Club career
Kovačević joined Čukarički in 2019 from FK Partizan. In June 2021 he signed his first professional contract. On 18 September 2021 Kovačević made his official senior debut for Čukarički in a match against Spartak Subotica. On 17 July 2022 Kovačević signed a new four-year contract with Čukarički.

International career
Kovačević has played internationally for Serbia at under-17, under-18 and under-19 levels.

References

External links
 

2004 births
Living people
Association football defenders
Serbian footballers
FK Čukarički players
Serbian SuperLiga players
Serbia youth international footballers